Love Trip is the debut studio album by American country music singer Jerry Kilgore. It was released on September 21, 1999 through Virgin Records.

Content
Love Trip charted three singles on the Billboard Hot Country Songs charts: "Love Trip" spent 20 weeks on the charts in late 1999, peaking at number 36. After it came "The Look" at number 49, and "Cactus in a Coffee Can" at number 73. Reba McEntire later covered "Cactus in a Coffee Can" on her 2019 album Stronger Than the Truth.

Critical reception

William Ruhlmann of AllMusic stated that the album "has been so carefully calibrated to current commercial notions of Nashville success that its real strengths are nearly obscured." He thought that "All Hell's Breakin' Loose" and "Cactus in a Coffee Can" were the strongest songs for showing the most country sound.

Track listing

Musicians
Jerry Kilgore: Vocals
Eddie Bayers: Drums
Mike Brignardello: Bass
Glenn Worf: Bass (tracks 1, 9, 11)
Brent Rowan: Electric Guitar
Brent Mason; Electric Guitar (tracks 1, 9, 11)
Biff Watson: Acoustic Guitar
Matt Rollings: Piano
Jimmy Nichols: Piano (tracks 2, 4, 5, 6, 8)
Sonny Garrish: Steel Guitar
Paul Franklin: Steel Guitar (tracks 1, 9, 11)
Larry Franklin: Fiddle
Rob Hajacos: Fiddle (tracks 1, 9)
Carl Marsh: Fairlight (tracks 3, 12)
Wes Hightower: Background Vocals

Production
Producer: Steve Bogard
Producer: Jeff Stevens
Producer: Scott Hendricks
Recorded by: John Guess
Recording Assistant: Patrick Murphy
Additional Recording by: John Kinz
Additional Recording Assistant: Mike Hanson
Engineer: John Guess
Engineer Assistant: Patrick Murphy
Engineer Assistant: Chris Rowe
Mastered by: Hank Williams at Mastermix
Production Coordinator: Kelly Giedt

All track information and credits were taken from the CD liner notes.

References

1999 debut albums
Jerry Kilgore (singer) albums
Virgin Records albums
Albums produced by Scott Hendricks